The Joint Base Cape Cod is a state-designated joint base created by the Commonwealth of Massachusetts and the United States War Department in 1935. Governor James Curley signed the state bill to allocate and purchase land for a military facility, and establishing a formal commission to manage this new state military property and personnel.  After  of land was secured on Cape Cod, the Massachusetts National Guard began erecting tents and a basic training program in the following year. Formerly the Massachusetts Military Reservation, it was renamed in 2013 to Joint Base Cape Cod by Massachusetts, although it has no federal recognition.

1970s 
Otis Air National Guard Base underwent boundary changes in 1975. This realignment included these installations: Otis Air National Guard Base, Camp Edwards, and the Coast Guard Air Station Cape Cod.

Cape Cod Space Force Station was created when the air force returned in 1978. The U.S. Air Force constructed the Precision Acquisition Vehicle Entry Phased Array Warning System (PAVE PAWS). PAVE PAWS is designed to detect airborne ballistic missiles and  monitor orbiting satellites.

Military bases

Otis Air National Guard Base
Camp Edwards
Cape Cod Space Force Station
Coast Guard Air Station Cape Cod
Coast Guard Base Cape Cod

Other facilities
Port Security Unit 301
Civil Air Patrol Coastal Patrol 18, Cape Cod Composite Squadron (NER MA 044)
Massachusetts National Cemetery
Barnstable County Correctional Facility and Sheriff's Office
Massachusetts Environmental Management Commission

See also
Massachusetts Military Reservation Wind Project at Joint Base Cape Cod
List of military installations in Massachusetts
United States Coast Guard Air Stations

References

External links

 

Bourne, Massachusetts
Falmouth, Massachusetts
Mashpee, Massachusetts
Military installations in Massachusetts
Sandwich, Massachusetts
Installations of the United States Army National Guard
1935 establishments in Massachusetts
Military installations established in 1935